Colibri may refer to

 Colibri (bird), a genus of hummingbird
 Colibri Group, suppliers of cigarette lighters and other items
 Estadio Nido del Colibri, a multi-use stadium in Cuernavaca, Mexico
 COLIBRI, a Lisp machine co-processor
 Rey Mysterio (born 1974), wrestler, by ring name
 Colibri (film), a 1924 German silent film

Transport
 Brügger Colibri, a family of sports aircraft
 Eurocopter Colibri, a helicopter
 HMS Colibri, several vessels of the Royal Navy
 HMS Colibri (1809), a captured French-built naval sloop in the Royal Navy
 IMA Colibri, a one-person electric vehicle
 I.Ae. 31 Colibrí, an Argentine civil trainer aircraft
 Leopoldoff Colibri, a biplane

See also
 Colibri del Sol Bird Reserve, a nature reserve in Colombia
 Kolibri (disambiguation)
 Calibri, a typeface family